There are two geographic regions in the Boy Scouts of America with the name Iron Horse District:

 Iron Horse District - Crossroads of America Council, BSA (Indiana)
 Iron Horse District - Golden Empire Council, BSA (California)
 Iron Horse District - Mount Diablo Silverado Council, BSA (California)
 Iron Horse District - Northeastern Pennsylvania Council, BSA (Pennsylvania)